Kingston Rowing Club (KRC) is a rowing club in England founded in 1858 and a member club of British Rowing.

The club is located on the River Thames at Kingston upon Thames, downstream and north-east of Kingston Bridge and Kingston Railway Bridge. On a long wide stretch, its rowers and scullers have the final and the second longest section of the weir-controlled river. Kingston have produced a significant list of international level oarsmen and oarswomen throughout its history and has won events at the British Rowing Championships and Henley Royal Regatta through the years.

Kingston Rowing Club is the supporting club for Kingston Regatta which is held above Kingston Bridge. Kingston organises Kingston Head of the River Race which is a warm-up for the national Head of the River Race on the Championship Course on the following weekend.

History 
The club started at Messenger's Boathouse, Kingston and was housed there for three years before moving upstream. From 1861 to 1935 the club was based above the bridges on Raven's Ait in Surbiton to the south. In 1935 the club moved downstream to premises known as the Albany Boathouse then moved to its purpose-built facilities in Canbury Gardens in 1968.

Notable members

 Edward Corrie
 Andy Holmes
 Gilbert Kennedy
 Courtenay Knollys
 Dick Offer
 Jack Offer
 Rebecca Romero
 Pongo Scarf VC
 R C Sherriff
 Denis Spotswood
 A A Stuart
 Douglas Stuart
 Julian Clary
 Kieran West
 Tim Crooks
 Dinghy Young DFC*

Facilities 

The club is the racing shell rowing club in Kingston upon Thames, but also provides training boats for less competitive rowing.

It shares the long, wide stretch with three sailing clubs upstream and downstream, the Royal Canoe Club (and The Skiff Club), Walbrook Rowing Club (the rowing club of Teddington), and school clubs of Tiffin, Kingston Grammar, and Surbiton High schools.

Kingston Students Rowing Club
Kingston Students Rowing Club (KSRC) was founded in 1972 as the Kingston Polytechnic Boat Club (KPBC). After 1992, Kingston Polytechnic was granted university status and the club changed its name to Kingston University Boat Club (KUBC). 

In 2011, Kingston University Boat Club (KUBC)  became Kingston Students Rowing Club (KSRC). KRC took over the training and coaching from Kingston University, maintain its fleet of boats and acquired its launches. University students receive automatic membership of KRC and still represent the university at the British Universities and Colleges Sport (BUCS) Regatta and in the University Indoor Rowing Series.

Annual events
The club organises Kingston Head of the River Race which is a warm-up for the national Head of the River Race on the Championship Course on the following weekend.  The organisation is associated with Kingston Regatta (formerly Kingston Amateur Regatta) since the club's founding – the regatta predates it by a year.

The club has a regular social calendar and Remenham Club rules entitle all established members to join to the social club which is at Henley on Thames, having one of its course-side venues, in the past having contributed to its funds in this case as a founder member.

Honours

Henley Royal Regatta

+composite

Recent British champions

c-composite

See also
Rowing on the River Thames

References

External links

Kingston Rowing Club official website

Sports clubs established in 1858
Rowing clubs of the River Thames
Sport in the Royal Borough of Kingston upon Thames
Remenham Club Founding Clubs